Emil Kalsaas (born 7 April 2000) is a Norwegian football defender who plays for Åsane.

He started his career in FK Fyllingsdalen, playing on the senior team in 2016 and 2017 before joining the junior team of SK Brann in 2018. He was also a prolific Norway youth international player. Kalsaas made his senior Brann debut in the 2019 Norwegian Football Cup against Arne-Bjørnar, and made his Eliteserien debut in October 2019 against Bodø/Glimt. In 2020 he was loaned out to Åsane for the entire season. His contract with Brann expired after the 2020 season and was not renewed.

References

2000 births
Living people
Footballers from Bergen
Norwegian footballers
FK Fyllingsdalen players
SK Brann players
Eliteserien players
Åsane Fotball players
Norwegian First Division players
Association football defenders
Norway youth international footballers